Babe Rainbow is the third album by British alternative rock band The House of Love: it was critically acclaimed by both Select and  Spin.

Background
Babe Rainbow is the only House of Love studio album to feature Simon Walker (ex-Dave Howard Singers as well as being Chris Groothuizen and Pete Evans’ bandmate in My White Bedroom). Walker had replaced Terry Bickers as lead guitarist in December 1989 and would himself leave the band in mid-1992 (to be replaced by Simon Mawby of The Woodentops). Former House of Love member Andrea Heukamp returned as a guest performer to add extra guitar and backing vocals.

The album’s producer Warne Livesey co-wrote two songs with Guy Chadwick – "You Don’t Understand" and "Feel" – which were the first House of Love songs not entirely written by Chadwick. Both were released as singles, as were "The Girl With the Loneliest Eyes" (which was released as a taster for the album) and "Crush Me". The album's title comes from a picture by Peter Blake which was also used for the cover artwork. The album was mixed by Tim Palmer at Townhouse Studios in London.

Reception

In his review for Select magazine, David Cavanagh wrote that band made "a heaven-sent album". He qualified it as "brilliant" and "gorgeous" and "as instinctively rock ' n ' roll as the Beatles, the Stones". In Spin, David Quantick wrote that the album "finds the House of Love entering the mainstream with their post-punk English alternative sensibilities intact". Babe Rainbow was not as popular as the first two House of Love albums, however, and signalled the start of the band's commercial decline.

Track listing
All songs written by Guy Chadwick unless otherwise noted

 "You Don't Understand" - 3:48 (Guy Chadwick, Warne Livesey)
 "Crush Me" - 3:46
 "Cruel" - 5:46
 "High in Your Face" - 4:41
 "Fade Away" - 3:24
 "Feel" - 3:54 (Guy Chadwick, Warne Livesey)
 "Girl with the Loneliest Eyes" - 3:42
 "Burn Down the World" - 5:53
 "Philly Phile" - 4:21
 "Yer Eyes" - 4:11

Personnel
Guy Chadwick - lead vocals, guitars, bass guitar
Simon Walker - guitars
Chris Groothuizen - bass guitar, backing vocals
Pete Evans –drums

with

Warne Livesey - guitar, hurdy-gurdy, keyboards, backing vocals
Andrea Heukamp - guitar, backing vocals
Pandit Dinesh – tablas

References

1992 albums
The House of Love albums
Fontana Records albums
Albums produced by Warne Livesey